Acrosin binding protein is a protein that in humans is encoded by the ACRBP gene.

Function

The protein encoded by this gene is similar to proacrosin binding protein sp32 precursor found in mouse, guinea pig, and pig. This protein is located in the sperm acrosome and is thought to function as a binding protein to proacrosin for packaging and condensation of the acrosin zymogen in the acrosomal matrix. This protein is a member of the cancer/testis family of antigens and it is found to be immunogenic. In normal tissues, this mRNA is expressed only in testis, whereas it is detected in a range of different tumor types such as bladder, breast, lung, liver, and colon.

References

Further reading